Royal Challengers Bangalore (RCB) is a franchise cricket team based in Bangalore, India, which plays in the Indian Premier League (IPL). They were one of the eight teams that competed in the 2010 Indian Premier League. They were captained by Anil Kumble. Royal Challengers Bangalore finished third in the IPL and qualified for the Champions League T20.

Squad

Indian Premier League season

Standings
Royal Challengers Bangalore finished fourth in the league stage of IPL 2010.

Match log

Champions League Twenty20

Match log

References

2010 Indian Premier League
Royal Challengers Bangalore seasons
2010s in Bangalore